Das Opfer may refer to:

The Sacrifice (1918 film)
Das Opfer, a 1937 opera by Winfried Zillig
Das Opfer, opera in 1 act by Emil von Reznicek on a libretto by Poul Knudsen (composed 1932)